Opifex fuscus, known commonly as the saltpool mosquito or by its Māori name naeroa, is an endemic mosquito that is widespread along the coast of New Zealand.

It lives and breeds in a coastal environment. This is a unique behaviour for mosquitoes as globally just 5% of the group breed on the rocky shore. Adults of the species are found throughout the intertidal zone while its larvae and pupae can be found in rock pools just above high tide.

It is one of two known species in the genus Opifex.

Description 
Adults are stocky with a dark grey-black coloured body. They are a primitive mosquito with few scales. Wings are a light brown colour. The head is vertex with no erect scales but has numerous curved hair-like structures known as setae.

The male of this species has long legs that allow it to walk on water and large claws used to grip females during mating.

Distribution 
This species is endemic to New Zealand and is found throughout the coast of the entire countries mainland islands. Additionally, populations have been found in the Kermadec Islands and Snares Island.

Habitat 
Salt pool mosquitoes are a strictly coastal species. The larvae are found in rock pools that occur within the spray zone above the high tide of the coast. The larvae can occur in both permanent and temporary rock pools, and can tolerate a wide range of water salinity levels. Adults are also frequently found on or near rock pools occupied by larvae.

Diet 
Adults of this species use their long proboscis to feed on the blood of birds, humans, and other coastal animals. They will feed by day and night but are most active during the day. Their bite is known to be painful. Unlike other mosquito species, the female does not require a blood meal to produce their first batch of eggs.

The larvae predate on small animals including the larvae of other mosquitos. They are also known to scrape organic matter from sediment at the bottom of rock pools.

Life history 
Adult females lay their eggs just above the water's surface. Larvae is washed into rock pools above the high tide mark where the develop over the winter. Once in the pupae stage they will not feed. In early spring, adult mosquitos emerge in large numbers from the rock pools.

Mating 
The males hatch first and use their long legs to sit on the water's surface. The males wait on the surface of salt water pools that contain larvae of their species. Once a larva pupates it will float to the surface. A male at the surface will detect this, possibly visually and by detecting vibrations in the water, and orientate itself to catch it. Males will attempt to intercept these pupa and grab them with their legs. Once the pupa begins to emerge, the male will attempt to begin genital contact with the individual. If the adult emerging from the pupa is male, then it will disengage and attempt to find another pupa. If the emerging adult is female, it will begin copulating with it before it has even fully left its pupa case. Because of this, all females mate very early in their adult lives.

There is evidence that larger males tend to be able to mate with more females than smaller males do, which suggests that mating for this species is non-random. This appears to be especially true when there are high levels of reproductive competition.

Parasites 
The larvae of O. fuscus are known to be infected by Coelomomyces opifexi, a parasitic fungus that uses copepods as intermediate hosts. Natural infection rates have been found to be as high as 47.3%.

References 

Insects described in 1902
Diptera of New Zealand